Paulo Cesar Quevedo de la Vega (born 1 February 1975) is a Mexican actor. He was a singer of the Mexican pop groups "Tierra Cero" and "Kairo".

Filmography

Films

Television

References

External links
 
 Official Site

1975 births
Living people
Mexican male film actors
Mexican male telenovela actors
People from Ciudad Juárez
Male actors from Chihuahua (state)